Ronald H. Petersen, more commonly known as Ron Petersen, born in 1934, is a mycologist of the University of Tennessee.
 He was the editor-in-chief of the journal Mycologia from 1986 to 1990.

See also
:Category:Taxa named by Ron Petersen

References

1934 births
Living people
American mycologists
University of Tennessee faculty
Place of birth missing (living people)